= Balaji Rajan =

Balaji Rajan from the Indian Institute of Science, Bangalore, India was named Fellow of the Institute of Electrical and Electronics Engineers (IEEE) in 2014 for contributions to high performance and low complexity space-time code designs for wireless communication systems.
